Ivan Gantschev (4 January 1925 – 29 June 2014) was a Bulgarian-German illustrator and author of children's books.

Ivan Gantschev was born in Veliko Tarnovo, Bulgaria. His father was a lawyer and his mother a school teacher. He attended the Academy of Fine Arts in Sofia. After leaving the Academy he worked as an artist and graphic designer.  In 1967 he left Bulgaria and settled in Frankfurt, Germany where he lived until his death in 2014.

In 1973 he published his first children's book "Mäusemax fliegt um die Welt " with Gakken Co Ltd., Japan.

He illustrated more than 70 books, writing the stories for most of them.

His picture books have been translated into English and have been published in the United Kingdom.

Ivan Gantschev's artwork has been exhibited in solo and group exhibitions around the world.

Awards
 1982: Kinderbuch Illustrationspreis, Vienna
 1983-84: Ehrenliste Österreichischer Kinder-und Jugendbuchpreis
 1985: Golden Medal, Biennale Bratislava

Exhibitions 
 1981: Klingspor Museum Offenbach (solo)
 1983: Children's Bookshop at the Metropolitan Museum New York (group)
 1984: Prado (group)
 1989: Itabashi Museum Japan (solo)
 1991: Internationale Jugendbuchbibliothek München (solo)
 1996: Stadtbibiliothek Freising (solo)
 1997: Jugendbuchmuseum der Stadt Troisdorf (solo)
 1997: Guest of Honour at the Children's Book Fair, Bologna
 2007: Guest of Honour at the Jugendbuchmesse in Saarbrücken
 2008: Guest of Honour at the Immagini della Fantasia, Palazzo Municipale, Sarmede<ref>{{cite web|title=Le immaginni della Fantasia: A Sarmede la XXVI Mostra Internazionale dIllustrazione per l'infanzia|url=http://www.connessomagazine.it/le-immagini-della-fantasia-sarmede-la-xxvi-mostra-internazionale-dillustrazione-linfanzia|accessdate=1 May 2015}}</ref>

 Selected works 
 Der Regen, Gakken Co Ltd., 1974
 Der Tiger, Gakken co Ltd., 1976, German edition 1976
 Der Stein, Gakken Co. Ltd. 1977
 Ota der Bär, Bohem Press, 1977, Finish edition " Okko Karhu , 1985, French edition "Poutou et le boucheron" , 1978, Italian edition " L'orso Ota"       , 1985, Swedish edition 1980, Canadian edition " Otto the Bear", 1985, Dutch edition "Ota de Beer", 1978, Danish edition " Bjornen Oskar", 1978,        Japanese edition, 1978, English edition " Otto the Bear" , 1978
 Der Hase und der Bär, Gakken Co. Ltd. 1978
 Taro der Elefant, Gakken Co. Ltd. 1979
 Wenn ich einmal groß bin, Gakken Co. Ltd.
 Ivan der Vulkan, Neugebauer Press, 1980, English edition 1981
 Wo das Glück wohnt, Neugebauer Verlag, 1980, US edition 1994, French edition 1980
 Der Mondsee, Neugebauer Press, 1981, English edition 1981, Japanese edition 1982, French edition 1983
 Der Weihnachtszug, Bohem Press, 1982, English edition " The Christmas Train" 1982, Canadian edition " The Christmas Train",   1984, Japanese edition, 1985, Spanish edition " El tren de nadal" , 1983, French edition " Le train de Noel", 1982, Finnish edition " Joulujuna", 1984, Danish edition, 1982, South African edition " Die Kersfeestrein", 1982
 Ich habe keine Angst Gakken Co. Ltd. 1985
 Die grüne und die graue Insel, Neugebauer Press, 1985, USA, Canadian, Brit. edition 1985
 Wo der Mond wohnt, Neugebauer Verlag 1986, US edition 1998
 Wo steckt Waldemar, Neugebauer Press 1989, English edition 1989
 Guten Morgen, Gute Nacht, Neugebauer Verlag, 1991, English edition 1991
 Der Fremde und die Leute von Kuschkundalowo, Nord Süd Verlag 1991, English Edition 1991
 Der Weihnachtsteddybär, Nord Süd Verlag, 1992, US edition 1994
 Wo der Mond wohnt, Neugebauer Verlag, 1998
 Mascha, Nord Süd Verlag, 1999, Italian edition 1999·
 Drei kleine Kaninchen, Neugebauer Verlag 2001, French edition 2007, English edition 2002
 Drei Teufel, Patmos Verlag 2002
 Die Ostergeschichte, Gütersloher Verlagshaus, 2006
 St. Martin und das Laternenfest, Sauerländer Verlag 2006
 Ein Weihnachtsfest für den Bären, Nord Süd Verlag, 2007, French edition 2007, English edition 2007
 So erzählt es der Mond, Nord Süd Verlag 2008
 Kleine Träumerei'', Gütersloher Verlagshaus 2012

References

1925 births
2014 deaths
German illustrators
Bulgarian illustrators
Bulgarian emigrants to Germany